The 2017–18 Nicholls State Colonels men's basketball team represented Nicholls State University during the 2017–18 NCAA Division I men's basketball season. The Colonels, led by second-year head coach Richie Riley, played their home games at Stopher Gym in Thibodaux, Louisiana as members of the Southland Conference. They finished the season 21–11, 15–3 in Southland play to earn a share of the regular season championship. As the No. 2 seed in the Southland tournament, they lost in the semifinals to Stephen F. Austin.

On March 15, 2018, head coach Richie Riley left Nicholls to take the head coaching job at South Alabama. Two weeks later, the school promoted assistant coach Austin Claunch to head coach.

Previous season
The Colonels finished the 2016–17 season 14–17, 7–11 in Southland play to finish in a five-way tie for eighth place. They failed to qualify for the Southland tournament. Senior forward Liam Thomas led Division I in blocks per game with a 4.19 average.

Roster

Schedule and results

|-
!colspan=9 style=| Non-conference regular season

|-
!colspan=9 style=| Southland regular season

|-
!colspan=9 style=| Southland tournament

Source

See also
2017–18 Nicholls State Colonels women's basketball team

References

Nicholls Colonels men's basketball seasons
Nicholls State
Nicholls State Colonels men's basketball
Nicholls State Colonels men's basketball